The Cook County Recorder of Deeds was the recorder of deeds of county government in Cook County, Illinois until the position's abolishment in 2020.

History of office
The office was established in December 1872. Before this, the Clerk of the Circuit Court of Cook County served as the ex-officio recorder of deeds for Cook County, Illinois.

On November 8, 2016, Cook County voters approved a binding referendum to eliminate the office, merging its functions into the purview of the Cook County Clerk. The office formally ceased to exist on December 7, 2020.

Officeholders

Recent election results

|-
| colspan=16 style="text-align:center;" |Cook County Recorder of Deeds general elections
|-
!Year
!Winning candidate
!Party
!Vote (pct)
!Opponent
!Party
! Vote (pct)
!Opponent
!Party
! Vote (pct)
!Opponent
!Party
! Vote (pct)
|-
|1984
| | Harry "Bus" Yourell
| | Democratic
| | 1,232,485 (60.94%)
| | Deborah L. Murphy
| | Republican
| | 789,906	(39.06%)
| 
| 
| 
| 
| 
| 
|-
|1988
| | Carol Moseley Braun
| | Democratic
| | 1,020,805 (54.32%)
| | Bernard L. Stone
| | Republican
| | 795,540	(42.33%)
|Text style="background:#008000 | Edward M. Wojkowski
|Text style="background:#008000 | Illinois Solidarity
|Text style="background:#008000 | 62,968 (3.35%)
| 
| 
| 
|-
|1992
| | Jesse White
| | Democratic
| | 1,121,865 (58.07%)
| | Susan Catania
| | Republican
| | 809,963 (41.93%)
| 
| 
| 
| 
| 
| 
|-
|1996
| | Jesse White
| | Democratic
| | 1,061,436 (65.33%)
| | Patrick A. Dwyer
| | Republican
| | 499,551 (30.75%)
|Text style="background:#D2B48C | Brenda Hernandez Frias
|Text style="background:#D2B48C | Harold Washington Party
|Text style="background:#D2B48C | 53,421 (3.29%)
| Smith Wiiams
| Justice Party 
| 10,251 (0.63%)
|-
|2000
| | Eugene "Gene" Moore
| | Democratic
| | 1,167,630 (73.01%)
| | Arthur D. Sutton
| | Republican
| | 431,717 (26.99%)
| 
| 
| 
| 
| 
| 
|-
|2004
| | Eugene "Gene" Moore
| | Democratic
| | 1,283,762 (70.74%)
| | John H. Cox
| | Republican
| | 530,945 (29.26%)
| 
| 
| 
| 
| 
| 
|-
|2008
| | Eugene "Gene" Moore
| | Democratic
| | 1,324,426 (70.49%)
| | Gregory Goldstein
| | Republican
| | 451,452 (24.03%)
| | Terrence A. Gilhooly
| | Green
| | 102,968 (5.48%)
| 
| 
| 
|-
|2012
| | Karen Yarbrough
| | Democratic
| | 1,313,967 (73.82%)
| | Sherri Griffith
| | Republican
| | 466,038 (26.18%)
| 
| 
| 
| 
| 
| 
|-
|2016
| | Karen Yarbrough
| | Democratic
| | 1,647,174 (98.58%)
| Others
| Write-ins
| 7,250 (0.81%)
| 
| 
| 
| 
| 
|

References

 
1872 establishments in Illinois
2020 disestablishments in Illinois